Check Into Cash is a financial services retailer with more than 1,100 stores in 30 states. The company was founded in 1993 by W. Allan Jones in Cleveland, Tennessee, where the headquarters are located today.

The firm offers payday loans, online payday advances, title loans, bill payment services, check cashing, reloadable prepaid debit cards, and Western Union money transfers and money order services.

History 

Jones founded Check Into Cash in 1993. He has been referred to as "the father of the payday lending industry" for creating the first national payday lending chain.
In 1973, at age 20, he left college, where he had been pursuing a business degree, to help stabilize the family’s business, the Credit Bureau of Cleveland (TN). He purchased the reporting and debt collection business in 1977 and built it into one of the largest credit bureau databases in Tennessee.  He sold the credit reporting side of the business to Equifax in 1988, retaining the name and collection agency division. He then built the company to be the largest in the state and sold it in 1998.

Check Into Cash has grown to become one of the largest payday loan companies in the United States, with over 1,200 locations.

In 2012, the firm acquired Cash and Cheque Express, a consumer financial services chain in the United Kingdom.
In 2013, the firm acquired Great American Pawn and Title and Quick loans, both based in Georgia, plus Great American Cash Advance and Nations Quick Cash Title Pawn, which operate in Mississippi, Alabama, and Tennessee. Check Into Cash has also acquired Title First Title Pawn, which is based in Georgia.

Other organizations 

Previously, Check Into Cash was a founding member of the Community Financial Services Association of America, which sets best practices standards for its members in the payday advance industry.
The firm has affiliate companies that operate under these brand names:
U.S. Money Shops
U.S. Money Title Loan
U.S. Money Shops Pawn
Check Into Cash Title Pawn
LoanByPhone.com
Title First Title Pawn
Great American Pawn and Title
Great American Cash Advance
Quic!oans
Nations Quick Cash Title Pawn
As of recently, Check Into Cash has been bought out and is now an entity of Community Choice Financial Institution. CCFI owns Cash 1 and California Check Cashing Stores as well.

Criticism 
The company has been criticized for its exorbitant interest rates and has been accused of exploiting the poor. The payday loan model is instituted with the intent that customers will be unable to pay back the debt in the allotted time, causing them to renew the loan multiple times, resulting in interest several times greater than the original sum of money borrowed. This business model, once illegal in many states was made possible after Jones donated to the campaigns of several state legislators, convincing them to legalize it.

See also 
Alternative financial services in the United States
Payday loans in the United States

References

External links 
Official Website
Check Into Cash Locations
LoanByPhone  A wholly owned subsidiary of Check Into Cash, Inc
Check Into Cash on the Map

Financial services companies of the United States
Companies based in Tennessee
Privately held companies based in Tennessee
Financial services companies established in 1993
1993 establishments in Tennessee
Companies based in Cleveland, Tennessee